William G. Miller (March 16, 1905 – May 1985) was an American rower who competed in the 1928 Summer Olympics and in the 1932 Summer Olympics.

In 1928 he was part of the American boat, which won the silver medal in the coxless fours event.

Four years later he won his second silver medal this time in the single sculls competition.

External links
 profile

1905 births
Rowers at the 1928 Summer Olympics
Rowers at the 1932 Summer Olympics
Olympic silver medalists for the United States in rowing
American male rowers
Medalists at the 1932 Summer Olympics
Medalists at the 1928 Summer Olympics
1985 deaths